Christopher "Monte" Belmonte (born 1978) is a radio personality in Western Massachusetts known for his fundraising event Monte's March, in its twelfth year in 2021.

Belmonte is a program director and morning show host at The River, WRSI, in the 6-10 am slot. He broadcasts while he is on his fundraising march from a portable transmitter in a shopping cart he pushes. The walk takes place over two days, walking 43 miles from Springfield to Greenfield, Massachusetts, with Belmonte often in costume. He is often joined by Congressman Jim McGovern who has marched with him nine out of the last twelve years. His 2020 march raised $614,577 for the Food Bank of Western Massachusetts. During the COVID pandemic many schools did "solidarity marches," doing local marches while raising money for local food banks.

Belmonte also writes about wine for the Valley Advocate. He has been a regular guest bailiff on Judge John Hodgman. He supports other charity projects, raising money for cancer with the Cancer Connection Campout, and being a judge for Stir Up Some Love which raises money for the Treehouse Foundation. He was named one of Business West's 40 Under 40 in 2017 when he was 39. He is the board president of the Shea Theater in Turners Falls, Massachusetts.

Belmonte is of Italian American heritage. He was born in Dorchester, Massachusetts and raised in Norton, Massachusetts. He is married and has three children.

References

External links
 Monte's March Official Site

Living people
American radio DJs
Food security
1978 births